Heteroacanthella ellipsospora is a species of fungus of uncertain familial placement in the order Auriculariales. The fungus is lichenicolous (lichen-dwelling), and it parasitises the apothecia and thallus of the crustose lichen Lecanora carpinea. Heteroacanthella ellipsospora was formally described as a new species in 2014 by Juan Carlos Zamora, Sergio Pérez-Ortega and Víctor Rico. It was first described from specimens collected in the Spanish provinces of Jaén and Madrid, and later reported from Sweden.

The fungus has spiny (acanthoid) basidia, the first known lichenicolous basidiomycete with this characteristic. The hymenium of the fungus (the spore-producing region) eventually replaces the hymenium of its host. It produces basidiospores with typical dimensions of 10–14 by 6.5–9.5 μm; the species epithet refers to the ellipsoidal shape of the spores. The effect of infection on the host ranges from being barely visible to forming pale swellings (similar to galls) that measure 0.1–0.8 mm.

References

Auriculariales
Fungi described in 2014
Fungi of Spain
Fungi of Sweden
Lichenicolous fungi